The school system in Hyderabad, Telangana, India consists of an array of structured systems. Children typically start school (junior or lower kindergarten) at the age of three, progressing to senior or upper kindergarten followed by twelve years of study. Class 10 and class 12 involve taking public examinations conducted by various accreditation boards.

Business schools

Jiddu Krishnamurti Schools
 The Magnet School, Jubilee Hills, Hyderabad
 Vidyaranya High School, Adarsh Nagar, Hyderabad
 Walden's Path School, Jubilee Hills, Hyderabad

Preschools
Nasr School Pre Primary, Somajiguda and Jubilee Hills
Vignan Schools, Hyderabad

Aided schools
All Saints High School, Abids
Bharatiya Vidya Bhavan's Public School - Vidyashram, Jubilee Hills
Hyderabad Public School, Begumpet and Ramanthapur
Little Flower High School
St. Mary's High School, Secunderabad
 St. Patrick's High School, Secunderabad
St. Pauls High School

Girls' schools
 Nasr School
Rosary Convent High School
St. Anns Girls High School - Secunderabad, Tarnaka, Bollaram and Mehdipatnam
 Stanley Girls High School

Un-aided private schools (CBSE)

 Akshara International School l, Hyderabad
The Gaudium School, Kollur
 Open Minds - A Birla School, Kollur, Near Gachibowli, Hyderabad
 Jubilee Hills Public School, Jubilee Hills, Hyderabad
Oxford Grammar High School, Himayatnagar
P.Obul Reddy Public School, Jubilee Hills
 Pallavi Model School, Hasmathpet
Silver Oaks - The School of Hyderabad, Bachupally, Miyapur
Goldcrest School, Gachibowli, Hyderabad
Meru International School, Hyderabad

Un-aided ICSE schools

 Nasr School

IGCSE

 The Gaudium School, Kollur
 CHIREC International, Hyderabad
Green Gables International School, Madhapur
The Magnet School, Hyderabad
Walden's Path School, Jubilee Hills
Meru International School, Hyderabad

International Baccalaureate (IB) 

 The Gaudium School, Kollur
 CHIREC International, Hyderabad
Indus International School-Hyderabad
International School of Hyderabad, Patancheru
 Oakridge International School, Gachibowli

Others
 Kendriya Vidyalaya No. 1 AFA, Dundigal
 Kendriya Vidyalaya No. 2 AFA, Dundigal

References

Hyderabad

Schools
Schools in Hyderabad